Vištytis (Yiddish: ווישטינעץ Vishtinets) is a small town in Marijampolė County, in southwestern Lithuania. It is the administrative centre of Vištytis elderate within Vilkaviškis District Municipality.

Geography
The town is situated on the northeastern shore of Lake Vištytis, close to the Russian border (Kaliningrad oblast). 

The town has preserved its street structure and market square since the 18th century. Vištytis Regional Park is near the town.  Southwest are Vištytis hill fort, and in a nearby village Nebūtkiemis is big Vištytis stone, preserved geologic artifact.

History
Vištytis was established in the first half of the 16th century, on the border with the Polish Duchy of Prussia. The first mention of the Višytis manor dates from 1538. Around it a settlement of Lithuanian, Polish, German and Russian citizens started to grow rapidly. On September 8, 1570 Sigismund II Augustus, in his capacity as Grand Duke of Lithuania, granted Vištytis city rights and coat of arms. It was the first town in the region.

In 1776 Vištytis lost its city rights, although some administration remained in the city, as it is known from the records in 1785 and 1790. Town representatives participated in the Great Sejm and succeeded in regaining city rights, although it did not get a royal privilege. That caused conflict with local elders, and the case was taken to the court. The outcome of the court is not clear, but the town preserved some of autonomy in the 19th century.

In the 19th century, a major industry in Vištytis was the manufacture of brushes. After the railroad line from Königsberg, East Prussia, to Russia was constructed in 1861 through Kybartai, some kilometers to the north, the town declined rapidly.  Beginning in the 1850s, a significant number of the town's Jews emigrated to Germany, the United States, and South Africa. In 1915, the town was devastated by Imperial Russian troops retiring after the Winter Battle of the Masurian Lakes.

After the 1939 Molotov–Ribbentrop Pact, the Lithuanian territory up to the border at Vištytis was occupied by Soviet forces. Immediately after the launch of Operation Barbarossa on 22 June 1941, the town was conquered by Wehrmacht forces. During the Holocaust, all of Vištytis' Jews were murdered, mainly by local collaborators in the town. The exact number murdered is unclear; estimates range from 200 - 400 Jews (out of the town's general population of around 1000). First the men were shot, then the women - but, to save bullets, the Jewish children were killed by having their heads bashed against the trees in the town park. A memorial to the victims was later erected by the Soviets near a windmill called Grist Mill, but the plaque made no mention that those buried in the nearby fields were Jews. Later, a 'Jewish' tombstone was erected that clearly noted what happened.

Renewed city coat of arms were granted by the President of Lithuania on May 3, 1999.

Notable people 
Julian Gruner - born in Vištytis (Wisztyniec) on 13 Oct. 1898, medical doctor practicing in Kalisz, sportsman (three-time national champion in the high jump and javelin throw), officer of the Polish Army murdered at the age of 42 along with about 3900 other Polish P.O.W.s in the Soviet death camp in Kharkiv between April and May 1940, part of the Katyn massacre.

References

Towns in Lithuania
Towns in Marijampolė County
Suwałki Governorate
Shtetls
Holocaust locations in Lithuania